Fantasía bética, or Andalusian Fantasy, is a 1919 piano composition by Manuel de Falla evoking the old Roman province of Baetis in southern Spain, today's Andalusia. It was commissioned by Artur Rubinstein, who planned to perform it in Barcelona that year but did not learn it in time and so wound up giving the premiere in New York on 20 February 1920; as it turned out, he would play it only a few times before dropping it from his repertory without recording it.

References

1919 compositions
Compositions by Manuel de Falla
Spanish compositions for solo piano
Falla